Halanaerobium kushneri is a strictly anaerobic and halophilic bacterium from the genus of Halanaerobium.

References

Clostridia
Bacteria described in 1999